Dorf on the Diamond is a 1996 comedy short film starring Tim Conway, Shawn Hess and Tim Conway Jr.

Plot
Baseball "Super Fan" Dorf goes to the East-West all star game. While enjoying the game, Dorf daydreams about being on the diamond himself and inspiring a baseball team to greatness as their coach (ala General Patton). Yet, even in his daydreams he's not entirely successful. Between daydreams, Dorf has his hands full coping with a bratty kid, a smart aleck peanut vendor and his uncooperative car.

External links
 

Dorf on the Diamond
1996 comedy films
1990s sports films
Diamond
Dorf on the Diamond
1990s sports comedy films
1990s English-language films
1990s American films